PTW Architects is an Australian architecture firm founded in Sydney in 1889. In 2013, PTW was acquired by Chinese architecture and engineering consulting firm China Construction Design International (CCDI).

PTW has become a highly diversified architectural practice with its design leaders specialized in a broad range of sectors including residential/mixed use, infrastructure, aged care, the arts (education/culture) and sport. PTW Architects has also made a point of developing techniques and relationships that allow the firm to create genuine partnerships with other architectural firms and specialist consultants, sharing specialised knowledge and awareness of local context and culture amongst a project's designers.

History

PTW Architects (formerly Peddle Thorp & Walker) was established in Sydney by James Peddle in 1889. James Peddle was notable in the domestic field, adapting the practice of architecture he learned in England and the United States to the Sydney climate and conditions. Samuel George Thorp was made a partner of the firm soon after his award-winning entry for Sydney's first planned garden suburb Daceyville in 1912.  In 1924 H. Ernest Walker joined as the third partner bringing an interest in efficiency and technology developed while working for major American firms in the 1920s. Henceforth the firm was known as Peddle Thorp & Walker and the office began to diversify from a purely domestic practice to one that also excelled at commercial and industrial architecture.

During the years of the Second World War, PTW continued to practice with numerous defence projects awarded to it by the Commonwealth Department of Works.  In the mid-1950s the massive growth of Australia's built environment saw PTW grow under the leadership of the late Graham Thorp to dominate the commercial building market, for which it is still renowned. The -high AMP Tower at Circular Quay built in Sydney in 1962 was the first office building to break the -height limit imposed in 1912. It was not only a physical landmark, but reached a standard of architectural refinement rare in such buildings at that time. Since then, PTW has been responsible for more than 50 commercial office buildings in Sydney and more than 150 throughout Australia, New Zealand and South-East Asia. PTW is also responsible for the bulk of the harbour waterfront development opportunities in Sydney; most recently with Rogers Stirk Harbour + Partners on the Barangaroo project.

Contributing to the firm's projects is the ability to create buildings where commercial objectives are balanced with cultural and public uses, leading to the enhancement of the public realm and a city's facilities. This can be seen in projects such as the Walsh Bay Redevelopment, Angel Place and City Recital Hall, the recently completed extension of the National Gallery of Australia, the Forum Development, and East Circular Quay.

Major architectural works
PTW Architects has designed some of Australasia's landmark buildings including the following major architectural projects:

See also

Architecture of Australia

References

External links

 PTW Architects

Architecture firms of Australia
Organisations based in Sydney